Lovesick is a 1983 American romantic comedy film written and directed by Marshall Brickman.  It stars Dudley Moore and Elizabeth McGovern and features Alec Guinness as the ghost of Sigmund Freud.

Plot

Psychoanalyst Saul Benjamin takes on a patient temporarily as a favor to a colleague friend, Otto Jaffe, who is infatuated with her.  After her doctor dies, Chloe Allen comes to see Dr. Benjamin and immediately he is smitten with her, too.

The doctor-patient relationship is violated by Dr. Benjamin's romantic impulses toward Chloe and by his intense jealousy of anyone who comes near her, including Ted Caruso, an arrogant Broadway actor with whom she has become involved. The psychiatrist's wife also is carrying on an affair with Jac Applezweig, an artist.

The ghost of Dr. Sigmund Freud, the father of modern psychology, visits Dr. Benjamin from time to time to dispense warnings and wisdom. Benjamin's work begins to suffer as he abandons patients like Mrs. Mondragon, finding her tedious, and treats the paranoia of another, Marvin Zuckerman, by designing a peculiar handmade hat for him to wear.

A board of inquiry calls in Dr. Benjamin to consider revoking his license. In the end, he admits his feelings to Chloe and concludes that he prefers true love to treating the sick.

Cast
 Dudley Moore as Saul Benjamin
 Elizabeth McGovern as Chloe Allen
 Alec Guinness as Sigmund Freud
 Wallace Shawn as Otto Jaffe
 Ron Silver as Ted Caruso
 John Huston as Dr. Larry Geller
 Alan King as Dr. Lionel Gross
 Selma Diamond as Dr. Harriet Singer
 Larry Rivers as Jac Applezweig
 David Strathairn as Zuckerman
 Christine Baranski as the Nymphomaniac
 Renée Taylor as Mrs. Mondragon
 Fred Melamed as Psychoanalyst

Reception

Release
Lovesick was released in theatres on February 18, 1983. The film was released on DVD on October 20, 1998, by Warner Home Video.

Critical response
Film critic Vincent Canby wrote in his review, "Mr. Moore and Miss McGovern are such appealing lovers that the movie successfully bypasses all questions of ethics." Book editors Laurence Goldstein and Ira Konigsberg wrote in their book, The Movies: Texts, Receptions, Exposures, "One looks back with nostalgia to a time when psychotherapists are not fools like [...] lovesick fools like Dudley Moore [...] Psychotherapists were certainly portrayed as comic and horrific figures in earlier films, but they were a good deal of respect than in recent years."

Production
Lovesick was one of two early-1980s movies originally intended to star Peter Sellers. Production was to have begun in early 1981, once Sellers had finished shooting Romance of the Pink Panther. Sellers's death in July 1980, before Romance of the Pink Panther had even started production, meant that his roles in both Lovesick and 1984′s Unfaithfully Yours went to Dudley Moore.

References

Citations

Sources

External links
 
 
 
 

1983 films
American romantic comedy films
1983 romantic comedy films
Films with screenplays by Marshall Brickman
Cultural depictions of Sigmund Freud
Warner Bros. films
Films directed by Marshall Brickman
Films scored by Philippe Sarde
The Ladd Company films
1980s English-language films
1980s American films